This was the first edition of the tournament and first of two editions of the tournament to start the 2021 ATP Challenger Tour year.

Denys Molchanov and Aleksandr Nedovyesov won the title after defeating Luis David Martínez and David Vega Hernández 3–6, 6–4, [18–16] in the final.

Seeds

Draw

References

External links
 Main draw

Antalya Challenger - Doubles